Mohamed Rayan Samandi is a Tunisian foil fencer, African champion in 2014. At the 2012 Summer Olympics, he competed in the individual event but was defeated in the second round.

Career
Samandi took up fencing at the age of ten. In 2005 he was the first African to win a stage of the Junior World Cup in Viana do Castelo in Portugal. He claimed the gold medal at the 2007 All-Africa Games.  

Samandi qualified for the 2008 Summer Olympics in Beijing through his results at the African qualifying fencing tournament held in Casablanca, but could not attend the competition due to lack of funds. He qualified to the 2012 Summer Olympics as the best-ranked African fencer. In the first round, he defeated 15–8 Great Britain's Husayn Rosowsky, but he fell 7–15 in the next round to World No.1 Andrea Cassarà.

He is a member of the AS Bourg-la-Reine fencing club in the suburbs of Paris. He won a bronze medal at the 2011 French national championships with them.

He qualified to represent Tunisia at the 2020 Summer Olympics.

References

External links

Tunisian male foil fencers
Living people
Olympic fencers of Tunisia
Fencers at the 2012 Summer Olympics
1986 births
Competitors at the 2019 African Games
African Games competitors for Tunisia
Fencers at the 2020 Summer Olympics
African Games medalists in fencing
African Games gold medalists for Tunisia
Competitors at the 2007 All-Africa Games
21st-century Tunisian people